Banepa is a genus of moths of the family Crambidae. It contains only one species, Banepa atkinsonii, which is found in India (Darjeeling).

References

Acentropinae
Crambidae genera
Monotypic moth genera
Taxa named by Frederic Moore